is a Japanese voice actress. Uchikawa is currently affiliated with Sigma Seven.

Filmography

Television Animation
 Chouja Reideen (1996), Kirari Saijyou
 Brave Command Dagwon (1996), Volleyball Staff
 Mystery of Nonomura Hospital (1996 OVA), Chisato Mamiya
 Manmaru the Ninja Penguin (1997), Mamiko
 Cowboy Bebop (1998), Announcer, Murial (Ep. 7), Flight Announcer
 St. Luminous Mission High School (1998 TV series), Koushinzuka Yukine
 Crest of the Stars (1999 TV series), Grieda
 Dual! Parallel Trouble Adventure (1999), D, Mena Fitzgerald
 Kakyuusei (1999 TV series), Mahoko Mochida, cat (ep 1)
 Dual! Parallel Trouble Adventures (1999 OVA), D Sanada, Mena Fitzgerald
 Hamtaro (2000), Kana Iwata, Kapuru-kun
 Dennou Boukenki Webdiver (2001 TV series), Angel, Mika Arisugawa
 Gravion (2002 TV series), Tesera
 D.C. ~Da Capo~ (2003), Jungle Ranger No. 3, Linda
 Gravion Zwei (2004), Tesera
 Phoenix: Sun (2004), Marimo
 Madlax (2004), Elanore Baker
 Angel Blade Punish! (2004 OVA), Moena Shinguji / Angel Blade
 Pumpkin Scissors (2006), Hannah (ep 9)
 D.Gray-man (2007), Sarah (ep 29)
 El Cazador de la Bruja (2007), Margarita (ep 10)
 Mameushi-kun (2007), Mameushi
 Mix Mix Chocolate drama CD (2003), Committee Executive

OVA
 My Sexual Harassment (1996), John
 Elf ban Kakyuusei (1997), Mahoko Mochida
 Yu-No (1998), Ayumi Arima
 Blue Submarine No. 6 (1998), Mutio's Friend
 Refrain Blue (2000), Hayase Shizuku
 MazinKaiser (2001), Sayaka Yumi
 Happy World! (2002), Sanae Ohmura
 Step Up Love Story (2002), Kaoru (ep 3)
 Mazinkaiser: Shitou! Ankoku Daishogun (2003), Sayaka Yumi
 Hininden Gausu (2005), Kurama-HIME
 Banner of the Stars III (2005), Grieda (ep 1)

Theatrical animation
 Tottoko Hamutaro: Hamu Hamu Land Daibouken (2001), Kana-chan
 Tottoko Hamutaro: Ham Ham Ham~Jya! Maboroshi no Princess (2002), Kapuru-kun
 Tottoko Hamutaro: Ham Ham Paradi-chu! Hamutaro to Fushigi no Oni no Ehonto (2004), Kapuru-kun

Dubbing
 Ginger Snaps, Brigitte Fitzgerald (Emily Perkins)
 Music and Lyrics, Cora Corman (Haley Bennett)
 Suspiria (1998 DVD edition), Suzy Bannion (Jessica Harper)

References

External links
 
 

1972 births
Japanese voice actresses
Living people
Male voice actors from Saitama Prefecture
Sigma Seven voice actors